The Krogsta Runestone is a runestone designated as U 1125 in the Rundata catalog.
The stone is located in Krogsta near , in Uppsala Municipality, Sweden, in the historic province of Uppland.  It was first described by Johannes Bureus in 1594.

Stone
Four fragments presumed to be associated with the stone surround it.

Inscription and decoration
Alongside a drawing of a man with outstretched hands, it bears an Elder Futhark inscription, reading  mwsïeij (uninterpretable). On the right face is an additional  sïainaz, probably for Proto-Norse stainaz "stone". The inscription has been interpreted as a "spelling lesson", distinguishing vocalic and consonantal forms for the semi-vowels j and w, and as magical.

See also
List of runestones

References

Further reading
Düwel, Klaus (2001). Runenkunde. 3rd ed. Stuttgart, Weimar: J.B. Metzler 
Ohlmarks, Åke (1978). 100 Svenska Runinskrifter. Borås: Bokförlaget Plus

External links

Elder Futhark inscriptions